The twelfth season of King of the Hill originally aired Sundays at 8:30–9:00 p.m. (EST) on the Fox Broadcasting Company from September 23, 2007 to May 18, 2008.

Production
The showrunners for the season were John Altschuler and Dave Krinsky.

Episodes

References

2007 American television seasons
2008 American television seasons
King of the Hill 12